Matelea obliqua, commonly known as climbing milkvine, limerock milkvine or northern spinypod, is a species of flowering plant in the dogbane family. It a twining herbaceous vine that produces maroon flowers in summer.

It is native to the eastern United States, where it is found in areas of calcareous rocky woodland. It is generally uncommon throughout its range, and is found in low densities.

References

obliqua
Flora of the North-Central United States
Flora of the Northeastern United States
Flora of the Southeastern United States
Flora without expected TNC conservation status